Bernhard Schobinger is a Swiss contemporary artist jeweler.

Early life and education
Bernhard Schobinger attended the School of Applied Arts in Zurich for two years, followed by Goldsmith's apprenticeship between 1963 and 1967. In 1968, he opened a workshop-gallery in Richterswil and started to produce his own work. In the 80s he spent periods of time in London, New York and Berlin.

Career and work
Throughout his career as an art jeweler, Schobinger has blurred the lines between applied and fine arts.  His esthetic echoes Concrete art mainly under the influence of Max Bill, Punk culture of the 70s, Italian arte povera and Neo-Dada.

Often playing with contrasts, Schobinger's single pieces are made of material which varies greatly from recycled objects and pieces inherited from his mother to precious metals and gemstones.
Broken glasses, scissors or rusty material are used in a provocative way, making jewelry a means for a narrative on material culture.

As the art historian Roger Fayet put it, "His works are based not on 'neither-nor' but rather on 'both... and', on juxtaposition and interpolation. What comes out of this is - despite all this use of rubbish - jewellery of extraordinary richness: rich in materials and forms, rich in qualities that are sensorily perceived and, most importantly, rich in meanings and wit".

Schobinger has been invited as a visiting lecturer in a number of Universities and Academies, including the Royal College of Art in London, Hiko Mizuno College of Jewelry in Tokyo, the Rhode Island School of Design. the Gerrit Rietveld Academy in Amsterdam, the Haute Ecole d'Arts Appliqués in Geneva.

Awards
His work was rewarded with a number of awards. Most recently, in 2007, he received the Swiss Federal Design Award.

Others awards:
 1971 Diamonds-International Award, New York
 1972 Deutscher Schmuck-und Edelsteinpreis
 1994 Werkbeitrag des Kantons und der Stadt Luzern
 1998 The Françoise van den Bosch Award

Museum collections 
 Aargauer Kunsthaus, Aarau, Switzerland
 Corning Museum of Glass, Corning, New York, USA
 Gemeentemuseum Den Haag, Den Haag, The Netherlands
 Grassimuseum, Leipzig, Germany
 Musée des Arts Decoratifs, Palais du Louvre, Paris, France
 Museum of Design, Zürich Switzerland
 Museum of Fine Arts, Boston, United States
 Die Neue Sammlung, The International Design Museum, Munich, Germany
 Rhode Island School of Design Museum, Providence, Rhode Island, United States
 Royal College of Art, London, UK
 Schweizerisches Landesmuseum, Zürich, Switzerland
 Stedelijk Museum, Amsterdam, The Netherlands 
 The Museum of Fine Arts, Houston, United States
 Landesmuseum Württemberg, Stuttgart, Germany
 Victoria and Albert Museum, London
 Museum für Angewandte Kunst Köln, Cologne, Germany
 Museum für Gestaltung, Zurich, Switzerland
 National Museum of Art, Architecture and Design, Oslo, Norway
 National Gallery of Australia, Canberra, Australia

External links 
 Bernhard Schobinger website
 Necklace 'Hiroshima mon amour' by Bernhard Schobinger at the Victoria and Albert Museum, London
 'Crowned Heads and Vajra' - Bracelet and Box by Bernhard Schobinger at the Museum of Fine Arts, Houston, USA

Bibliographical references 
 Wilhelm Lindeman, ed. Gemstone/Art. Renaissance to the Present Day. Arnoldsche Art Publishers, 2016.
 Glenn Adamson, "Bernhard Schobinger: The Rings of Saturn", Arnoldische Art Publishers, Stuttgart, Germany 2013.
 Roger Fayet and others, "Bernhard Schobinger: Jewels Now", Stuttgart: Arnoldsche Art Publishers, Stuttgart, Germany 2003.
 "Ornament as art" The Museum of Fine Arts, Houston, USA, Arnoldische Art Publishers, Stuttgart, Germany 2007.
 Helen W. Drutt and Peter Dormer, "Jewelry of our time: Art, Ornament and Obsession", Thames&Hudson, London 1995.
 David Watkins, "The Best in Contemporary Jewelry", Quarto Publishing plc, London 1993.

References 

Living people
1946 births
Swiss artists
Artists from Zürich
Recipients of the Rakow Commission